Southern Districts is a South Australian baseball club playing in the South Australian Baseball League.  Known as the Hawks, their home ground is Peregrine Park in the Southern Adelaide suburb of Christie Downs.

Establishment 

The club was established in 1972 when the Marion Baseball Club relocated to the Southern suburbs and formed the Southern Districts Baseball Club.  It was not until the 1980/81 season that the club was granted District status by the SABL, which gave it the right to challenge to become a Division One Club. In the 1982/83 season the club won an A Grade premiership in Division Two and then challenged the Goodwood Baseball Club to a 3-game series to earn the right to become a Division One Club.  The club won the series and was promoted to a Division One club where it remains to this day. 1

Club Details 

 SABL Division 1 Premierships: Nil
 SABL Division 1 Grand Finals: 2
 SABL Division 1 Runners Up: 1994/95, 2004/05
 SABL Division 1 Mid Week Premierships: 1 (1992/93)
 Home Ground: Peregrine Park
 Most Games: Wayne O'Loughlin
 Most Years as Coach:

Capps Medallists 

The Capps Medal is awarded to the "best and fairest" player in the South Australian Baseball League during the Home and Away season. Southern Districts has no Capps Medallists.

Division 1 Squad 

2016:
Benjamin Short, C, 2;
Jai Payne, C, 3;
Braydon Edwards, C, 4;
Mitchell O'Neil, OF, 5;
Conor O'Neil, SS, 11;
Ben Jones, 2B, 18;
Troy Harrison, P, 19;
Jason Martin, 2B, 20;
Michael Johnston, P, 21;
Lachlan Rees, 1B, 23;
Nick Hutchings, P, 26;
Andrew Rodgers, 3B, 28;
Luke Hansen, 2B, 33;
Zach Lunnon, SS, 37;
Jake Macnamara, 3B, 38;
Daniel Hobson, 3B, 39;
Byron Turner, CF, 55;
Matthew Hutchings, LF, 62;
William Burke, P, 73;
Corey McGill, P, 74;
Carey Mcleoud, Cf, 79;
Michael Slee, C, 96;

2016/17 Results

SABL Batting Title 

The SABL Batting Title is awarded to the player with the best batting average at the completion of the South Australian Baseball League Home and Away season.  A batter must have a minimum number of Plate Appearances to qualify.  (Based on a formula of 3.1 x number of games the team played in a season).  Southern Districts has one SABL Batting Title recipient:

 2004/05 Shane Jennings (Batting Average of .502)

SABL Golden Glove 

2015/16 Byron Turner, Centre Field ( .973 fielding %, 8 assists, 63 put outs )

SABL All Star Team 

The SABL selects an All Star team at the completion of the Home and Away season.  Players considered the most outstanding player in their position are selected as members of the team.  Southern Districts has had five players selected in the SABL All Star Team.:

 1997/98 Troy Cook (Third Base)
 1997/98 Darren Ballard (Designated Hitter)
 1997/98 Gary Rice (Coach)
 2003/04 Jason Scarabotti (Right Field)
 2004/05 Shane Jennings (Catcher)
 2006/07 Taj Merrill (Pitcher)
 2007/08 Ben Brusnahan (First Base)
 2009/10 Ben Brusnahan (Designated Hitter)

SABL Rookie of the Year 

The SABL each year selects a rookie of the year recipient.  This player must be in his first full season and have demonstrated consistent and outstanding performance in the Division 1 competition.  Southern Districts has one SABL Rookie of the Year award recipient:

 2007/08 Patrick Inglis
 2008/09 Brady Green

Claxton Shield Representatives 2002 - present

The Claxton Shield is an annual event held by the Australian Baseball Federation.  Generally now held during the lead up to the Australia Day long weekend in January, the Shield began in 1934 and after a hiatus between 1989/90 and 2000/01 due to the Australian Baseball League, was reformed as a week-long State based tournament in 2002.  Since 2002, Southern Districts has had seven players compete in the Claxton Shield for South Australia:

 2004 Troy Cook (Infielder)
 2005 Ben Brusnahan (1st Base), Shane Jennings (Catcher) & Dushan Ruzic (Pitcher)
 2006 Ben Brusnahan (1st Base), Adam Widdison (Pitcher) & Tyler Green (Pitcher)
 2007 Taj Merrill (Pitcher)
 2008 Troy Cook (Infielder), Taj Merrill (Pitcher) & Tyler Green (Pitcher)
 2009 Adam Crabb (Pitcher)

Club Life Members 

 Ken Martin ^
 Don May
 John Blunsden
 Trevor Dodman
 Max Wight
 Robert Mead ^
 Anthony Bobos
 John O’Loughlin
 John Bannister
 Joy Bannister ^
 Gary Maynard
 Darren Ballard
 Terry Kitto
 Greg Wood
 Roger Bosley
 Trevor Powell ^
 Wayne O’Loughlin
 Paul Szymanski
 Glennys Sporne
 Glen Harris
 Malcolm Sporne
 Paul Ingram
 Darren Bosley
 Ray Hann
 Marino Scarabotti
 Sue Jennings
 Kym Stanley
 Kevin Jennings

^ deceased

Player Life Members 

Player life members must have played for more than 10 years and 500 games for the club.

 Wayne O’Loughlin
 Darren Ballard
 Malcolm Sporne
 Darren Bosley
 Craig Bosley
 Todd Goldfinch
 Geoff Puckett
 Andrew Short
 Jason Scarabotti
 Paul Harvey
 Shane Jennings
 Adam Widdison
 Julian Smith
 Ben Brusnahan
 Troy Cook
 Ben Jones

External links
Southern Districts

Australian baseball clubs
Sporting clubs in Adelaide
Baseball teams established in 1972
1972 establishments in Australia